Adam Webster (born 3 July 1980 in Nottingham, England) is an English footballer who played in The Football League for Notts County.

Career
Webster started his career at his local side Notts County, where he made his senior debut in a 1–0 defeat away at Scunthorpe United during the 1999–2000 season. He was released at the end of the season and joined non-league side Bedworth United. He then went on to play for Worcester City, Hinckley United and Corby Town. He left Corby in March 2011.

References

External links

English footballers
Notts County F.C. players
Bedworth United F.C. players
Worcester City F.C. players
Hinckley United F.C. players
Corby Town F.C. players
English Football League players
1980 births
Living people
Association football forwards